Jesús Carrasco, born 1972 in Olivenza, is a Spanish writer. He held a wide range of jobs in his youth, from PE teacher to grape-picker to graphic designer. In 1992, he moved to Madrid where he began his writing career. In 2005, he moved to Seville, where he still lives.

Carrasco's debut novel Intemperie appeared in 2013 to critical acclaim and has been translated into more than twenty languages, as well as made into a film, Out in the Open. It won a number of prizes and was nominated for several more. His second novel La tierra que pisamos (2016) won the EU Prize for Literature. His third book Llévame a casa was published in February 2021.

The relationship between humans and nature is a fundamental theme of all his novels. Carrasco has said he has been inspired by Raymond Carver, Richard Ford, John Updike and John Edward Williams

References

Spanish writers
1972 births
Living people